Sea of Shadows is a documentary about environmental activists (Sea Shepherd), the Mexican Navy, marine scientists and undercover investigators trying to prevent the extinction of the vaquita, a species of porpoise and the smallest whale in the world, by pulling gillnets, doing research, and fighting back Mexican cartels and Chinese mafia who are destroying ocean habitats in their brutal pursuit to harvest the swim bladder of the totoaba fish, known as the "cocaine of the sea". The 1 hour and 44 minutes long film is directed by Richard Ladkani.

Reception 

Sea of Shadows premiered in Austria on September 20, 2019. It won the Sundance award for World Cinema Documentary and was acquired by the National Geographic Channel for broadcast The film received the Cinema for Peace International Green Film Award in 2020. [2] "Conveying just how fraught and delicate conservation efforts can be, logistically and emotionally, an extraordinary sequence unfolds as a pursuit on the water, placing the viewer smack in the midst of it."

See also 

 The Cove (film)
 Behind The Cove, a documentary in response to the film
 Blackfish (film)
 The Whale (2011 film)

References

External links 
 
 
 RottenTomatoes

2019 documentary films
2019 films
2019 in the environment
American documentary films
Documentary films about animal rights
Documentary films about Mexico
Documentary films about ocean life
Documentary films
Environment of Mexico
Films about activists
Films about dolphins
Mexican documentary films
National Geographic Society films
2010s Spanish-language films
2010s English-language films
2010s American films
2010s Mexican films